Korynochoerus is an extinct genus of even-toed ungulates that existed during the Miocene in Europe and Asia Minor.

References

Prehistoric Suidae
Miocene mammals of Europe
Miocene mammals of Asia
Miocene even-toed ungulates
Prehistoric even-toed ungulate genera